This page lists pioneers and innovators in healthcare either in Wales or by Welsh people, including in medicine, surgery and health policy.

Medical pioneers 

 Frances Hoggan - Various research including the anatomy and physiology of lymph nodes
 Llewellyn Jones Llewellyn - An authority on rheumatism and related diseases
 Thomas Lewis - Pioneer cardiologist and clinical scientist
 William Evans - Cardiology; description of the anatomy of coarctation of the aorta; controls in drug trials; studies on electrocardiography; first accurate description of ‘familial cardiomegaly’
 D. Geraint James - Classifying the clinical and radiological features of sarcoidosis
 Horace Evans - Link between hypertension and nephritis
 Julian Tudor-Hart - Local population health and hypertension among other topics 
 Eluned Woodford-Williams - Established geriatrics as a speciality and began practice of admitting all patients over 65 year old to her unit
 Robert Armstrong-Jones - Instituted special training for mental health nurses and occupational therapy for patients, and developed modern methods to treat mental diseases
 George Edward Day - Reforms to medical examinations
 George Owen Rees - The first to analyse the chemistry of urine and also did new work on the nature and shape of the blood corpuscles.
 William Roberts - Introduced the term Antagonism into microbiology and one of the first to describe the action of antibiotics including penicillin
 Keith Peters - Improved understanding of glomerulonephritis
 John David Spillane - Established the modern study of Tropical Neurology
 Dafydd Stephens - A founder of audiological medicine
 Denis John Williams - Pioneering work on using EEG to study cerebral disease

Surgical pioneers 

 Hugh Owen Thomas - Pioneered orthopaedic surgery techniques including the Thomas splint and Thomas test
 Robert Jones - Robert Jones stablished orthopaedic surgery as a modern speciality. His organisational skills,  treatments and rehabilitation of soldiers saved many lives during the first World War. He pioneered the use of radiography and the Jones fracture is named after him
 William Thelwall Thomas - Pioneer of abdominal surgery; introducing the detempered needle, the black silkworm gut, and large-handled Spencer Wells forceps. He also introduced the transvere incision for an umbilical hernia repair; introduced the double incision for double renal calculi at the kidney and ureter; and made a significant investigation into the composition of renal calculi
 Tudor Thomas - Pioneer of corneal grafting

Policy 

 Frances Hoggan - First Welsh female physician and advocated for gender equality in medicine
 Mary Morris - First woman to train as a doctor at the University College of Wales, Aberystwyth, admitted in 1895. Possibly the first woman to train in medicine in Wales.
 David Lloyd George - National Insurance Act 1911
 Aneurin Bevan - Creation of the National Health Service
 Eluned Woodford-Williams - Affected government policy on geriatrics, improving geriatric services
 Julian Tudor-Hart - Social advocate and devised the term Inverse care law
 Timothy Stamps - Reformed and improved Zimbabwe's healthcare system.
 Ilora Finlay - Regulation of smoking, organ donation, sunbeds alcohol pricing, and improvements in palliative care

See also 

 List of Welsh innovations and discoveries

References 

Healthcare in Wales
Science and technology in Wales